This One's for You may refer to:

Albums
This One's for You (Barry Manilow album) or the title song (see below), 1976
This One's for You (Deez Nuts album) or the title song, 2010
This One's for You (Luke Combs album) or the title song, 2017
This One's for You (OTT album) or the title song, 1997
This One's for You (Teddy Pendergrass album), 1982
This One's for You, by David and the Giants, 1978
This One's for You, an EP by Luke Combs, 2015

Songs
"This One's for You" (Barry Manilow song), 1976
"This One's for You" (David Guetta song), the official song of UEFA Euro 2016
"This One's for You", by the Concretes from The Concretes, 2003
"This One's for You", by Fleshquartet featuring Robyn, 2006
"This One's for You", by Stuff from More Stuff
"This One's for You", by Therapy? from Shameless, 2001

See also
"Henry James, This One's for You", a 2005 science fiction short story by Jack McDevitt